Jesus Lives (Dutch: Jezus Leeft) is a political party in the Netherlands that was founded in November 2013 by evangelist Joop van Ooijen in Giessenburg.

History 

The history of the party lies within Joop van Ooijen's evangelisation, originally spreading the gospel by means of flyers at cycling races his son participated in. After an accident, he stopped spreading flyers. In 2008, he painted the text 'JEZUS REDT' (Jesus Saves) on the roof of his farm with reflective paint which is generally used for painting road markings. The case resulted in a civil case by the municipality of Giessenburg, which made headlines in 2009 and 2010.

The party participated in Giessenlanden and some other municipalities in the 2014 Dutch municipal elections. The party also participated in the 2014 European Parliament election in the Netherlands with nine candidates on the list. In the 2015 Dutch provincial elections the party participated in North Brabant, Flevoland, Utrecht, and South Holland. The party never won a seat.

In the 2017 Dutch general election the party participated in 7 electoral districts, with Florens van der Spek as party leader. The party won 3,099 votes, which was not enough for a seat. In the 2018 Dutch municipal elections, Jesus Lives participated in thirteen municipalities; nowhere was a seat obtained.

In the 2018 Dutch municipal elections Jesus Lives took part in three provinces. No seat was obtained in any of these three.

The party was again running in the 2021 Dutch general election, but gained no seats.

Election results

Dutch general elections

Ideology 
According to the party's founder, Joop van Ooijen, the party's primary purpose is making Jesus known to the people. The party opposes abortion, the European Union, and supports environmentalism. Van Ooijen has said that the party's anti-abortion stance is non-negotiable, having said that he would "not sit at the table with someone who supports abortion, that is not open to discussion. We will not negotiate, that's what's different between us and the other Christian parties." In that same interview, he expressed confidence that he would get the 64,000 votes in the 2017 Dutch general election required to obtain a seat, but they would end up getting 3,099 votes.

See also
Christian right

References

External links
  

2013 establishments in the Netherlands
Eurosceptic parties in the Netherlands
Confessional parties in the Netherlands
Protestant political parties
Right-wing parties in Europe
Political parties established in 2013